Spiritual left refers to a spiritually or religiously based position that shares the social transformative vision of the political left and its commitment to social justice, peace, economic equality, and (in recent years) ecological consciousness, but who base their commitment on spiritual or religious traditions. 

Two present-day examples of spiritual leftism are Jim Wallis, editor of Sojourners magazine, who finds a call for peace and for the elimination of poverty in the Christian Gospel and Rabbi Michael Lerner, editor of Tikkun magazine, calling for a "New Bottom Line" where productivity, efficiency and rationality would be judged not only in material terms, but also in terms of love, generosity, peace, social justice, ecological sanity and awe and wonder at the grandeur of the universe.

See also

 Buddhist socialism
 Christian left
 Christian socialism
 Engaged Spirituality
 Islamic socialism
 Islamo-leftism
 Jewish left
 Network of Spiritual Progressives

References

Religion and society
Left-wing politics
Liberalism and religion
Political terminology